Rank comparison chart of air forces of North and South American states.

Officers

Warrant officers

See also
Air force officer rank insignia
Comparative air force enlisted ranks of the Americas

References

Americas
Air force ranks
Military comparisons